Joseph Alexander McAndrew (October 2, 1879 – August 13, 1963) was an American football player and an officer in the United States Army.

Biography
Joseph McAndrew was born in Osage Mills, Arkansas on October 2, 1879. He attended the United States Military Academy, where he played at the end position for the Army football team from 1901 to 1903. He was selected by The Post-Standard (Syracuse, New York) as a first-team end on the 1902 College Football All-America Team.

After graduating from the Military Academy, McAndrew served in the infantry, United States Army, attaining the rank of colonel. He received a Distinguished Service Medal for his service as the director of the infantry specialists school at Langres, France, during World War I.

He died in Bentonville, Arkansas on August 10, 1963.

References

1879 births
1963 deaths
Army Black Knights football players
American football ends
Players of American football from Arkansas
People from Benton County, Arkansas